Fit for Fashion is a reality TV show on STAR World hosted by Louise Roe, with fashion photographer Todd Anthony Tyler. The show features fitness trainers Christine Bullock and Mitch Chilson. Contestants face challenges and learn new skills while training and transforming their bodies. The show was filmed in Malaysia with the state of Terengganu as its primary location and contestants' residence.

Contestants

Episode Synopsis

Episode 1: The Raw Material 
First aired October 16, 2014

Tensions start to rise, as some contestants appear to bite off more than they can chew.

Our contestants arrive at Tanjong Jara Resort, an exclusive resort on Malaysia's East Coast. Surprised by their luxurious surroundings, they are quickly brought back down to earth with their first exhausting challenge. Split into two teams, they must first build a raft – no easy task – row it out to a distant fishing boat and retrieve critical props for their first beach fashion challenge.

Tensions start to rise within the first few minutes, as some contestants appear to bite off more than they can chew. It doesn’t take long to realize that one team clearly has what it takes while the other fails miserably and there is plenty of blame to pass around.

Most Valuable Player: Chelsey Hall
Bottom two: Hema Lata Veerasamy & Rusty
Eliminated: Hema Lata Veerasamy
Featured Photographer: Todd Anthony Tyler

Episode 2: Confidence is Key 
First aired October 23, 2014

Exhausted by their first few rounds in the gym, our contestants face a daunting new challenge.

Exhausted by their first few rounds in the gym, our contestants face a daunting new challenge. They must first climb up a raging waterfall wall and then repel down. The Most Valuable Player from the previous episode gets to pick her team members. Will she be strategic and pick the right team members or will she let her emotions get in the way?

Battered and bruised by the ferocious rocks, each contestant must then bring out their inner animal warrior to pose in the rain soaked forest for our celebrity photographer. Who will have the strength, stamina and confidence to pull this off? Who will be safe and who will be treading thin waters? Ultimately, are they even safe from one another? Tempers begin to flare as they all start to realize that this competition is tougher than they ever imagined. In addition, Vanessa, as a Mermaid Coach, does her best swimming through the treacherous waters.

Most Valuable Player: N/A
Bottom two: Andrew McCarthy & Ming Wolf
Eliminated: Andrew McCarthy
Featured Photographer: Todd Anthony Tyler

Episode 3: Mind Over Matter

Most Valuable Player: Jerald Foo
Bottom two: Fred Burnard & Shiva Nithiabala
Eliminated: Fred Burnard
Featured Photographer: N/A

Episode 4: Movement Matters
Most Valuable Player: Citira Corrigan
Bottom two: N/A
Eliminated: Ming Wolf

Episode 5: Commitment
Most Valuable Player: N/A
Bottom two: Shiva Nithiabala & Rusty
Eliminated: Rusty

Episode 6: Endurance Rules
Most Valuable Player: N/A
Bottom two: N/A
Eliminated: Chelsey Hall
Featured Photographer: Todd Anthony Tyler

Episode 7: Power Plays
Most Valuable Player: N/A
Bottom two: N/A
Eliminated: None.
Featured Photographer: Todd Anthony Tyler

Episode 8: Discovery From Within

Kristina team up with one of the strongest player in the competition but it is enough to keep her in the game . Then the contestants get flirty during a photoshoot.

Most Valuable Player: N/A
Bottom two: Shiva Nithiabala & Vanessa Ammann
Eliminated: Shiva Nithiabala
Featured Photographer: Todd Anthony Tyler

Episode 9: Trust Is A Two Way Street 
Most Valuable Player: N/A
Bottom two: N/A
Eliminated: Jerald Foo
Featured Photographer: Todd Anthony Tyler

Episode 10: The Journey To Win 
Top 3 : Matthew 'Matty' Kosub, Kristina Pakhomova & Citira Corrigan
Eliminated: Vanessa Ammann
Winner: Citira Corrigan
Featured Photographer: Todd Anthony Tyler, Zandra Rhodes

Results

References

External links
 Fit for Fashion website 

Fitness reality television series
2014 Malaysian television seasons